Persis is a feminine given name, meaning "from Persia". Notable people with the name include:

 Persis Drell (born 1955), American physicist
 Persis Karim (born 1962), American poet, editor, educator
 Persis Khambatta (1948–1998), Indian actress and model
 Persis Kirmse (1884–1955), British painter
 Persis Goodale Thurston Taylor (1821–1906), Hawaiian artist
 Persis Robertson (1896–1992), American artist

Feminine given names
English feminine given names